Vlasikha is a rural locality (a station) in Barnaul, Altai Krai, Russia. The population was 57 as of 2013.

References 

Rural localities in Barnaul urban okrug